RQ-00203078 is a drug which acts as a potent and selective blocker of the TRPM8 ion channel, which is the main receptor responsible for the sensation of cold. It was developed as a potential analgesic, and blocks the development of hyperalgesia following exposure to cold temperatures or chronic morphine administration.

See also 
 AMG-333
 PF-05105679

References 

Pyridines
Trifluoromethyl ethers
Trifluoromethyl compounds
Carboxylic acids
Chloroarenes
Sulfamates